Whanganui Athletic FC are an association football team based in the New Zealand North Island city of Whanganui. They are traditionally the strongest team from the city, and played in the top flight of New Zealand football in both league and cup competitions. The team was founded in 1929 as Wanganui East Athletic, but briefly changed their name to Wanganui FC between 1974 and 1976 before reverting to their original name before dropping the East to just become Wanganui Athletic, changing to Whanganui Athletic when their home city was officially re-named.

National competition
Athletic played in the 1993, 1994, and 1995 regional superclub championships, reaching the national league stage in 1993, where they finished seventh.

Athletic reached the last 16 stage of New Zealand's premier knockout cup competition, the Chatham Cup in 1970, and went one stage further to become quarter-finalists in 1996.

Wanganui United
In 2009 the team entered a partnership with local rivals Wanganui City to form a top-level team, Wanganui United, with both clubs feeding the squad. The idea behind this was to push the level of football in Wanganui. The idea was short-lived; after the 2010 season Wanganui United disbanded, with the players released back to their respective clubs.

Honours
1981 Central League Division Two
1987 Central League Division Three North
1992 Central League Premier Division
1994 Central Superclub Plate
1996 Central Superclub Championship
2010 Western Premiership Championship
2014 Federation League Championship
2022 Central Federation League

New Zealand representation from Whanganui Athletic

Hayden Englefield (U-20, U-23)
James Musa (U-20, National team)
Brad Scott (National team)

External links
Ultimatenzsoccer website's Wanganui East Athletic page

Association football clubs in New Zealand
Sport in Whanganui
1929 establishments in New Zealand